Twenty-Three Tales is a popular compilation of short stories by Leo Tolstoy.  According to its publisher, Oxford University Press, the collection is about contemporary classes in Russia during Tolstoy's time, written in a brief, morality-tale style. It was translated into English by Louise Maude and Aylmer Maude.

Contents

The stories are divided into seven parts:

 Tales for Children
 God Sees the Truth, But Waits
 The Prisoner of the Caucasus
 The Bear Hunt
 Popular Stories
 What Men Live By
 Quench the Spark
 Two Old Men
 Where Love Is, God Is
 A Fairy Tale
 Ivan the Fool
 Stories Written to Pictures
 Evil Allures, But Good Endures
 Wisdom of Children
 Ilyás
 Folk-Tales Retold
 The Three Hermits
 Promoting a Devil
 How Much Land Does a Man Need?
 The Grain
 The Godson
 Repentance
 The Empty Drum
 Adaptations from the French
 The Coffee-House of Surat
 Too Dear!
 Stories Given to Aid the Persecuted Jews
 Esarhaddon, King of Assyria
 Work, Death, and Sickness
 The Three Questions

Reception

According to Plough, a publication managed by the Anabaptist Bruderhof Communities since 1920, the work is perfect for those daunted by the longer, complicated works of the Russian master, saying that these tales "illumine eternal truths with forceful brevity."  According to Rabbi Dr. Israel Drazin, a 2009 reviewer with HistoryInReview, Twenty-Three Tales is an excellent collection that doesn't focus too much on Tolstoy's opinion of Christianity, so much as it is "about proper behavior: that people should help one another."  According to famed Tolstoy translator Aylmer Maude, the work contains "several of his best tales for the people: 'How Much Land Does a Man Need?', 'Ilyas', 'The Three Hermits', and the excellent temperance story, 'The Imp and the crust.'"

Editions

According to an editor at Cambridge University Press, at least one of the stories presented Tolstoy had heard from a wandering storyteller in 1876.

The work was originally published in 1907 by Funk & Wagnalls.  It was published by Oxford University Press in 1917, 1924, who would republish it again in 1928, 1947,  and 1950.

It was republished by The Plough (maintained by the Bruderhof Communities) in 1998.

See also
 Bibliography of Leo Tolstoy

References

External links

Original text:
 Twenty Three Tales, from RevoltLib.com
 Twenty Three Tales, from Marxists.org

Short stories by Leo Tolstoy
1903 short story collections
Oxford University Press books